Twee pop is a subgenre of indie pop that originates from the 1986 NME compilation C86. Characterised by its simplicity and perceived innocence, some of its defining features are boy–girl harmonies, catchy melodies, and lyrics about love. For many years, prominent independent record labels associated with twee pop were Sarah Records (in the UK) and K Records (in the US).

Characteristics

The definition of twee is something "excessively or affectedly quaint, pretty, or sentimental", supposedly born from a childish mispronunciation of the word sweet. A retrospective fascination with the genre in the US saw Americans eagerly defining themselves as twee. According to The A.V. Clubs Paula Mejia:

AllMusic says that twee pop is "perhaps best likened to bubblegum indie rock – it's music with a spirit of D.I.Y. defiance in the grand tradition of punk, but with a simplicity and innocence not seen or heard since the earliest days of rock & roll". The author Marc Spitz suggests that the roots of twee stem from post-war 1950s music. While the culture categorized itself under the moniker of "indie" (short for independent), many major twee powerhouses gained mainstream critical acclaim for their contributions to the twee movement.

Related movements

Cuddlecore is a movement that emerged as a consequence of twee pop that was briefly prominent in the mid-1990s. This label described a style marked by harmony vocals and pop melodies atop a punk-style musical backing. Cuddlecore bands were usually, although not always, all female and essentially represented a more pop-oriented variation on the contemporaneous riot grrrl scene.

References

Indie pop
20th-century music genres
British styles of music
British rock music genres
Pop music genres